The Piaggio PD.808 was an Italian business jet built by Piaggio. It was designed as a joint venture between Piaggio and Douglas Aircraft Company of Long Beach, California, United States.

Design and development
Originally named the PD.808 Vespa Jet the business jet was designed in a joint venture between Piaggio and the Douglas Aircraft Company. The basic design work was carried out by Douglas and the prototype was built at the Piaggio factory at Finale Ligure.

The PD.808 was a low-wing cantilever cabin-monoplane with tip-tanks and powered by two rear-mounted Bristol Siddeley Viper 525 turbojets. It has retractable tricycle landing gear and was originally designed with a cabin for a pilot and six-passengers.

The first Viper 525-powered prototype (with Italian Serial Number MM577) first flew on 29 August 1965, this was followed by a second Viper 525 powered prototype and two civil demonstrators.

The company tried to interest commercial operators (including offering a General Electric CJ610 variant) but the only interest was from the Italian Air Force as a liaison, training and radar calibration aircraft with an order for 25. The Italian Air Force aircraft were powered by Viper 526 turbojets.

Variants

PD-808VIP: VIP transport.
PD-808TA: navigation trainer.
PD-808RM (radiomisure): radio calibration, four-built
PD-808GE (guerra elettronica): aircraft modified for Electronic warfare, PD-808GE1 entered service in 1972, the PD-808GE2 in 1977.
PD-808TF: Proposed turbofan-powered version. Not built.

Operators

 Italian Air Force operated 22 Piaggio PD.808 from 1970 until 2003

Accidents and incidents
On 18 June 1968 one of the demonstration aircraft I-PIAI crashed in bad-weather when it flew into the side of Mount Jaizkibel, near San Sebastian, Spain, all six on-board including the Italian businessman Lino Zanussi and the Piaggio chief test pilot Davide Albertazzi were killed.

Aircraft on display

Italy
 MM62015 – PD-808GE on static display in Lucca, Tuscany. It was previously operated by the Italian Air Force.
 MM61961 - PD-808GE on static display outside the Museo Storico dell'Aeronautica Militare di Vigna di Valle (Italian Air Force Museum in Vigna di Valle), with "Ultimo Volo 17.5.03 (Final Flight 17-5-'03)" titles.

Specifications (PD.808)

References

PD.808
Douglas aircraft
1960s Italian business aircraft
1960s Italian military utility aircraft
Twinjets
Low-wing aircraft
Aircraft first flown in 1964
Cruciform tail aircraft